Hasan Ahmed is a Bangladeshi Cinematographer. He won the Bangladesh National Film Award for Best Cinematography three times for the films Ghorer Shotru (1994), Ghani (2006) and Gohine Shobdo (2010).

Selected films

Awards and nominations
National Film Awards

References

External links
 

Living people
Bangladeshi cinematographers
Best Cinematographer National Film Award (Bangladesh) winners
Year of birth missing (living people)